The President of the Local Government Board was a ministerial post, frequently a Cabinet position, in the United Kingdom, established in 1871.  The Local Government Board itself was established in 1871 and took over supervisory functions from the Board of Trade and the Home Office, including the Local Government Act Office, which had been established by the Local Government Act 1858, as well as the Poor Law Board, which it replaced.

The position was abolished in 1919, following the First World War, and the duties transferred to the new position of Minister of Health.

List of presidents of the Local Government Board (1871–1919)

References

Health
Poor Law in Britain and Ireland
Defunct ministerial offices in the United Kingdom
1871 establishments in the United Kingdom
1919 disestablishments in the United Kingdom